The Northrop N-9M was an approximately one-third scale,  span all-wing aircraft used for the development of the full size,  wingspan Northrop XB-35 and YB-35 flying wing long-range, heavy bomber. First flown in 1942, the N-9M (M for Model) was the third in a lineage of all-wing Northrop aircraft designs that began in 1929 when Jack Northrop succeeded in early experiments with his single pusher propeller, twin-tailed, twin-boom, all stressed metal skin Northrop X-216H monoplane,  and a decade later, the dual-propeller N-1M of 1939–1941. Northrop's pioneering all-wing aircraft would lead Northrop Grumman many years later to eventually develop the advanced B-2 Spirit stealth bomber, which debuted in 1989 in US Air Force inventory.

Design and development
On 30 October 1941, the preliminary order for development of the B-35 Flying Wing bomber was confirmed, including engineering, testing, and most importantly a 60 ft (18 m) wingspan, one-third scale aircraft, designated N-9M. It was to be used in gathering data on flight performance and for familiarizing pilots with the program's radical, all-wing design. The first N-9M was ordered in the original contract, but this was later expanded to three test aircraft in early 1943. A fourth was ordered a few months later after a crash of the first N-9M destroyed that airframe; this fourth N-9M incorporated various flight test-derived improvements and upgrades, including different, more powerful engines. The four aircraft were designated N-9M-1, -2, -A, and -B, respectively.

The N-9M framework was partially constructed of wood to reduce its overall weight. The wings' outer surfaces were also skinned with a strong, specially laminated plywood. The central section (roughly equivalent to the fuselage) was made of welded tubular steel. The aircraft were originally powered by two  Menasco C6S-1 "Buccaneer" inverted air-cooled straight-six engines, driving twin-bladed propellers, except for the N-9MB which was powered by two  Franklin XO-540-7 engines.

Operational history

The first flight of the N-9M occurred on 27 December 1942 with Northrop test pilot John Myers at the controls. During the next five months, 45 flights were made. Nearly all were terminated by various mechanical failures, the Menasco engines being the primary source of the problems. After roughly 22.5 hours of accumulated flight time, the first N-9M crashed approximately 12 miles (19 km) west of Muroc Army Air Base (now Edwards Air Force Base) on 19 May 1943. The pilot, Max Constant, was killed as he attempted to recover the aircraft from a right-hand, 60° nose-down spin. The investigation found that Constant had suffered control reversal, the control column had been pressed against his chest during his recovery attempt from the steep spin, preventing him from parachuting to safety. Actions were taken to fix this problem and prevent it from happening on other N-9M test aircraft.

When Northrop's Flying Wing bomber program was canceled, all remaining N-9M flight test aircraft, except for the final N-9MB, were scrapped. For more than three decades, it slowly deteriorated until the Chino, California Planes of Fame Air Museum acquired the aircraft in 1982 and began the labor-intensive restoration process. For the next two decades, former Northrop employees and other volunteers restored the N-9MB to its final flight configuration. Since 1993, the yellow-and-blue Flying Wing has been exhibited, with flight demonstrations at several airshows every year.

In April 2006, the N-9MB suffered an in-flight engine fire. The aircraft was landed safely with limited damage. Donations to the museum were solicited for its repair, and the aircraft was fully repaired to flight status. It was flown again during the annual Chino airshow on 15–16 May 2010.

On 22 April 2019, the N-9MB was destroyed shortly after takeoff, when it crashed into a prison yard in Norco, California. The pilot was killed but no ground casualties were reported. The National Transportation Safety Board attributed the crash to the "pilot's loss of control for undetermined reasons", stating that "given the significant fragmentation of the wreckage, the reason for the loss of control could not be determined".

Specifications (N-9M)

See also

References

Notes

Bibliography

 Coleman, Ted. Jack Northrop and the Flying Wing: The Real Story Behind the Stealth Bomber. New York: Paragon House, 1988. .
 Donald, David, editor. "Northrop Flying Wings", Encyclopedia of World Aircraft. Etobicoke, Ontario: Prospero Books, 1997. .
 Maloney, Edward T. Northrop Flying Wings. Corona del Mar, California: World War II Publications, 1988. .
 O'Leary, Michael. "Northrop's Flying Sorcery". Aeroplane, Volume 35, Number 6, Issue 410, June 2007. pp. 62–64.
 O'Leary, Michael. "The Shape of Wings to Come". Aeroplane, Volume 35, Number 6, Issue 410, June 2007, pp. 65–68.
 O'Leary, Michael. "Wings of Northrop, Part Two". Air Classics, Volume 44, Number 1, January 2008, Challenge Publications, Inc. ISSN 0002-2241. (Heavily illustrated, authoritative N-9M article.)
 New 'Flying Wing' Plane Hailed as Great Advance In Aviation. "The Baltimore American" newspaper, Section E, 9 February 1930. (Front-page feature article with two photos reporting on Northrop's flights with his first Flying Wing monoplane.)
 Parker, Dana T. Building Victory: Aircraft Manufacturing in the Los Angeles Area in World War II. Cypress, California: Dana Parker Enterprises, 2013. .
 Pape, Garry and John Campbell. Northrop Flying Wings: A History of Jack Northrop's Visionary Aircraft. Atglen, Pennsylvania: Schiffer Publishing, Ltd., 1995. .
 Wooldridge, E. T. Winged Wonders: The Story of the Flying Wings. Washington, D.C.: Smithsonian Institution Press, 1983. .

External links

 THE N9MB FLYING WING
 History of the Flying Wing
 Aviation Enthusiast Corner

Flying wings
1940s United States experimental aircraft
N-9M
Twin-engined pusher aircraft
Aircraft first flown in 1942